Mariënberg (Dutch Low Saxon: Mainbarg or Mainbarrug) is a village in the Dutch province of Overijssel. It is located in the municipality of Hardenberg, and lies on the westside of the Vecht river, between Hardenberg and Ommen.

History 
A village developed around the nunnery founded 1233 which moved to Zwartsluis in 1244. In 1405, a new nunnery was founded and named Beata Maria Virgo in Galilea, and the village became known as Mariënberg meaning "hill of Mary. In 1903, a train station was built in Mariënberg.

Transport 
 Mariënberg railway station

Notable residents 
 Christian Kist (born 1986), darts player
 Roel Kuiper (born 1962), politician, historian and philosopher

Gallery

References 

Populated places in Overijssel
Hardenberg